The Zec de la Rivière-Laval is a "zone d'exploitation contrôlée" (controlled harvesting zone) (zec) in the unorganized territory of the Lac-au-Brochet, in the municipalities of Colombier and Forestville, in La Haute-Côte-Nord Regional County Municipality, in the administrative region of Côte-Nord (North Shore), in Quebec, in Canada.

The "Association de chasse et pêche de Forestville" was incorporated on October 16, 1967 and received in spring 1980 a mandate to administer the Laval River which then acquire the status of "salmon zec".

Geography 
The Laval River flows from north to south in the unorganized territory of the Lac-au-Brochet and in the municipalities of Colombier and Forestville, to empty into the Bay Laval, in the Gulf of St. Lawrence, up to Forestville.

The Laval River has its source in Laval Lake, located in the unorganized territory of the Lac-au-Brochet in La Haute-Côte-Nord Regional County Municipality.

From the lake, the river travels  before emptying into the Laval Bay.

Toponymy 
The name of the zec is directly derived from the name of the Laval River, on the Côte-Nord (North Shore).

The name "ZEC de la Rivière-Laval" was made official on September 5, 1985 at the Bank of place names in the Commission de toponymie du Québec (Geographical Names Board of Quebec).

See also

Related articles 
 Lac-au-Brochet, unorganized territory 
 Colombier, municipality 
 Forestville, municipality 
 La Haute-Côte-Nord Regional County Municipality
 Côte-Nord (North Shore), administrative region of Quebec
 Zec de Forestville 
 Laval River 
 Zone d'exploitation contrôlée (Controlled harvesting zone) (zec)

References 

Protected areas of Côte-Nord
Protected areas established in 1980